is a Japanese esports organization with teams competing in Call of Duty, For Honor, Overwatch, PlayerUnknown's Battlegrounds, Rainbow Six: Siege and Splatoon 2. The organization was originally created in 2016 to compete in the PS4 version of Rainbow Six: Siege. The founder and owner is Yasuhiro "Kizoku" Nishi who also coaches the Rainbow Six Siege team.

Rainbow Six: Siege 

On 17 November 2018, Nora Rengo defeated Rogue and advanced to the semifinals of the Rainbow Six Siege Pro League Season 8, becoming the first APAC team to advance to a semifinals match. They were later joined by Australian Fnatic who defeated top North Americans, Evil Geniuses.

Roster

Tournament results

References

External links 
 

Esports teams established in 2016
2016 establishments in Japan
Esports teams based in Japan
Call of Duty teams
Defunct and inactive Overwatch teams
PlayerUnknown's Battlegrounds teams
Tom Clancy's Rainbow Six Siege teams